Mariama Colley is a radio personality, human rights activist and actress  from The Gambia. Mariama is best known for her support to society through volunteering and as the lead character in Hand of Fate.

Career 
She is a radio personality and an actress, she all has passion for social work through volunteerism

Awards 
Mariama Colley was awarded The National Certificate of Merit as Youth of the Month by The Gambian Ministry of Youths and  Sports, in collaboration with the Balance Group, for her contribution to national development, nominated for African Oscars as result of the female lead role she played in the movie Hand of Fate.

References 

Living people
1988 births
Gambia articles by importance